Negur (also Romanized as Negūr, Nagoor, Nagūr; also known as Nakūr) is a village in Howmeh Rural District, in the Central District of Bam County, Kerman Province, Iran. At the 2006 census, its population was 165, in 49 families.

References 

Populated places in Bam County